is a Japanese former javelin thrower. He set the world best year performance in 1989, throwing 87.60 metres at a meet in San Jose, California, United States on May 27, 1989. Initially, it was announced as a new world record of 87m86, 20cm higher than the previous world record, but the measurer re-measured it with a plastic tape measure and announced it as 87m60.

International competitions

References

1962 births
Living people
Sportspeople from Wakayama Prefecture
Japanese male javelin throwers
Olympic male javelin throwers
Olympic athletes of Japan
Athletes (track and field) at the 1984 Summer Olympics
Athletes (track and field) at the 1988 Summer Olympics
Asian Games gold medalists for Japan
Asian Games bronze medalists for Japan
Asian Games gold medalists in athletics (track and field)
Asian Games medalists in athletics (track and field)
Athletes (track and field) at the 1986 Asian Games
Athletes (track and field) at the 1990 Asian Games
Athletes (track and field) at the 1994 Asian Games
Medalists at the 1986 Asian Games
Medalists at the 1990 Asian Games
World Athletics Championships athletes for Japan
Japan Championships in Athletics winners
20th-century Japanese people
21st-century Japanese people